Lyell is a surname of Scotland traced to Radulphus de Insula, 11th-century Lord of Duchal Castle. "De insula" was subsequently translated into the Old French "de l'isle" and developed into a number of variants ([de] Lyell; [de] Lisle; [de] Lyle; see below). John Lyell in 1706 emigrated to Virginia and is the progenitor of the American Lyells.

Lyell may refer to:

People
 Henry Lyell (1665-1731), Swedish-born English businessman
 Charles Lyell (botanist) (1767–1849), Scottish botanist
 Charles Lyell (1797–1875), British geologist; son of the botanist; 1st Baronet Lyell of Kinnordy
 Mary Horner Lyell (1808–1873), conchologist; wife of the geologist
 Katharine Murray Lyell (1817–1915), British botanist and author; sister-in-law of the geologist
 Leonard Lyell, 1st Baron Lyell (1850–1926), Scottish Liberal politician; son of Katharine Murray Lyell
 Charles Henry Lyell (1875–1918), Liberal MP; son of Leonard Lyell
 Charles Anthony Lyell, 2nd Baron Lyell (1913–1943), Victoria Cross recipient; son of Charles Henry Lyell
 Charles Lyell, 3rd Baron Lyell (1939–2017), Conservative member of the House of Lords; son of Charles Anthony Lyell
 Maurice Lyell (1901 – 1975), lawyer
 Nicholas Lyell, Baron Lyell of Markyate (1938–2010), British Conservative politician at the centre of the Matrix Churchill affair, son of Maurice

Places
 Lyell Island, in Canada
 Mount Lyell (disambiguation)
 Lyell, New Zealand, a historic gold mining settlement
 Lyells, Virginia, a crossroads in Richmond County, Virginia
 A panorama of Victoria Crater, Mars, taken by the Opportunity Rover
 Lyell (lunar crater)
 Lyell (Martian crater)

See also
 Delisle (disambiguation)
 Lisle (disambiguation)
 Lyall (disambiguation)
 Lyle (disambiguation)